The Aṣmaʿiyyāt is a well-known early anthology of Arabic poetry by Al-Asma'i. The collection is considered one of the primary sources for early Arabic poetry along with the Jamharat Ash'ar al-Arab, Hamasah, Mu'allaqat and Mufaddaliyat. It consists of 92 qasidahs by 71 poets from both Pre-Islamic Arabia (44 of them jahili) as well as the early Islamic era.

Unlike the Mufaddaliyat, the Asma'iyyat have not been preserved in their entirety and there were originally more than the surviving 72 passages. The modern print was first compiled and republished by German Orientalist Wilhelm Ahlwardt.

See also
Abu Tammam
al-Mufaddal

Citations

9th-century Arabic books
9th-century poems
Arabic anthologies
Medieval Arabic poems